Richmond Racecourse was a British horse racing track situated at Richmond, North Yorkshire at first High Moor, then Low Moor, from 1765 to 1776. It was last used for horse racing in 1891. The grandstand, believed to have been designed by John Carr, is now the oldest surviving stone-built public grandstand in the world.

History
The grandstand was paid for by public subscription, being erected in 1775, and it is believed to be the work of architect John Carr, who also designed the grandstands at Doncaster and York. The land at Low Moor was levelled "at great public expense".

Christopher Rokeby, who spied on the Scottish court and Mary, Queen of Scots attended races at Gatherley, as did Roger Aston, a Cheshire-born courtier of James VI of Scotland.

A law was passed in 1740 by George II that races must not be run for a prize less than £50. This had been to prevent the lower classes engaging in horse-racing (they were accused of "Idleness"). The same law dictated that horse races were to start and finish on the same day. As a result of this, Richmond racecourse stopped its races, but they were revived in 1760. Between 1765 and the building of the main grandstand in 1775, a temporary wooden stand was erected each year, the impetus for a more permanent structure came about due to the course holding the Hambleton Hundred Guineas Race. Besides the main grandstand, a private stand was built in 1814 for the Zetland family.

Races were run in a clockwise direction.

The site last hosted races in August 1891; the Jockey Club had decided that one of the turns on the course was too tight for the modern thoroughbred horses. Additionally, the nearby course at Catterick was nearer to both the main roads and railways in the region. The grandstand had its lead roof stripped in the 1950s and further demolition occurred in the late 1960s.

Horses are still run and trained on the gallops by local owners, although the site is criss-crossed by public footpaths. The grandstand building, which is now a grade II* listed structure, is the oldest stone-built public grandstand in the world. Due to the grandstand's condition, it has appeared on Historic England's Heritage at Risk register in 2019.

See also
List of British racecourses

References

Sources

External links

Richmond, North Yorkshire
Defunct horse racing venues in England
1765 establishments in England
1891 disestablishments in England
Sports venues completed in 1765